Vysokovo is a rural locality (a village) in Malyginskoye Rural Settlement, Kovrovsky District, Vladimir Oblast, Russia. The population was 10 as of 2010.

Geography 
Vysokovo is located 23 km north of Kovrov (the district's administrative centre) by road. Koromyslovo is the nearest rural locality.

References 

Rural localities in Kovrovsky District